Government Bullies: How Everyday Americans are Being Harassed, Abused, and Imprisoned by the Feds is a book by United States Senator Rand Paul of Kentucky. The book contains anecdotes of difficulties people have had dealing with agencies of the US federal government.

The book was released in 2012, and is published by Center Street, a main publishing division of Hachette Book Group USA. The forward to the book was written by Paul's father, Ron Paul.

Reception
In his review of Government Bullies for The Washington Times, William Murchison wrote that Paul "never really ties things together with any artistry" and that the book is "more political barrage than academic rendering."

Plagiarism
Journalists discovered that Government Bullies contained passages that were copied from articles from the Heritage Foundation and the Cato Institute.  Further investigation revealed another four instances of plagiarism from articles by Jonathan H. Adler, Pacific Legal Foundation attorney Timothy Sandefur, and an article from Forbes. While citations were listed in the footnotes, the material was presented without quotes or indentation. Book publisher Center Street indicated that future printings would include attributions.

References

2012 non-fiction books
American political books
Books by Rand Paul
Books in political philosophy
Tea Party movement
Books involved in plagiarism controversies
Center Street (publisher) books